The 2013 Aberto Rio Preto was a professional tennis tournament played on clay courts. It was the second edition of the tournament which is part of the 2013 ATP Challenger Tour. It took place in São José do Rio Preto, Brazil between 7 and 13 October 2013.

ATP entrants

Seeds

 1 Rankings are as of 30 September 2013.

Other entrants
The following players received wildcards into the singles main draw:
  Marcelo Demoliner
  Augusto Laranja
  Marcelo Zormann
  Bruno Sant'Anna

The following players got into the singles main draw as an alternate:
  Gianluigi Quinzi

The following players received entry from the qualifying draw:
  Mitchell Krueger
  Wilson Leite
  Fernando Romboli
  Thales Turini

Champions

Singles

 João Souza def.  Alejandro González 7–6(7–0), 6–3

Doubles

 Nicolás Barrientos /  Carlos Salamanca def.  Marcelo Demoliner /  João Souza 6–4, 6–4

External links
Official Website
ITF Search
ATP official site

Aberto Rio Preto
Clay court tennis tournaments
Tennis tournaments in Brazil